Sheldon, Wisconsin may refer to:

 Sheldon, Monroe County, Wisconsin, a town containing Oil City
 Sheldon, Rusk County, Wisconsin, a village